Julián Arango Robledo (born October 6, 1969) is a Colombian television actor.

He is best known to fans around the world for his role as the temperamental fashion designer Hugo Lombardi in the Colombian mega-hit telenovela Yo soy Betty, la fea and its spinoff Ecomoda.

In April 1999, he married his Yo soy Betty, la fea co-star, Ana María Orozco. The marriage was short-lived, and the couple divorced in 2000.

In 2015, he played Henry Navarro, a Spanish-language adaptation of Breaking Bad's Hank Schrader, on Metástasis.

Filmography
 El Man es Germán (2019)....Hernando Perez
 Metástasis (2015)
 El Cartel de los Sapos (2011)
 Infiltrados (2011) ... Major Ramón García
 Las muñecas de la mafia (2009)....Claudio
 Adiós, Ana Elisa (2008) .... Calvo .... aka Te amo Ana Elisa
 El cartel de los sapos (2008) .... Guadaña
 Tiempo final (2008) .... Santiago
 Amas de Casa Desesperadas (2007) .... Tomas Aguilar
 Amores cruzados (2006) .... Santiago Rincón
 Eco moda (2001) .... Hugo Lombardi
 El inutil (2001) .... Martin Martinez
 Yo soy Betty, la fea (1999) .... Hugo Lombardi
 Perro amor (1998) .... Antonio Brando
 Tiempos difíciles (1995) .... Juan Diego Ramos Perfetti
  Narcos  (2015-2017)... Orlando Henao Montoya

See also
 Betty la fea

References

 

1968 births
Living people
Colombian male telenovela actors
Colombian male television actors
Place of birth missing (living people)
20th-century Colombian people